It's a Man's World is the twenty-first studio album by American singer and actress Cher released on November 6, 1995, by WEA, a label of Warner Music UK. This is also the start of her second stint with Warner Music Group. With an adjusted track list, the album was released in the United States on June 25, 1996, by Reprise Records. As of 1997, the album has sold 700,000 copies worldwide. In the UK the album peaked at number 10 and was certified Gold by the British Phonographic Industry (BPI) for selling more than 100,000 copies.

Album information 
It's a Man's World found Cher singing 'unconventional' songs in a style more associated with the Deep South, rather than her more familiar pop and rock roots. The album also stands out for Cher stretching her vocals to head register for such songs as "One by One" and "The Gunman", getting out of her comfort zone of her trademark husky contralto.

Cher signed with Warner Music UK in 1994 and recorded It's a Man's World in London in 1995. That same year the album was released all over Europe with "Walking in Memphis" as its lead off single. In the same year, it was certified gold in the UK by the British Phonographic Industry.

The original album release included fourteen songs, except for the United States edition in 1996, the track list included eleven songs, removing "I Wouldn't Treat a Dog (The Way You Treated Me)", "Don't Come Around Tonite" and "Shape of Things to Come". Although, "I Wouldn't Treat a Dog (The Way You Treated Me)" would be released in the United States as the official b-side to "One By One". The American release was also reviewed by critics as a "mid-'90s R&B/pop phenomenon" due to five songs being remixed to evoke a contemporary R&B feel. The new versions of those songs: "Not Enough Love in the World", "Paradise Is Here", "Angels Running", "What About the Moonlight" and "One by One" were labeled as album versions in the United States. Their new sound carried R&B influences, while their original versions were influenced by Southern rock and blues. Both the original album and the United States edition were released in Australia.

Singles 
Five singles were released to promote the album. A cover of Marc Cohn's "Walking in Memphis" served as the lead single off the album in Europe, Australia and Canada. In Europe, the single was a notable hit and charted higher than the original version. It peaked at #11 in the UK and reached the top 20 in several European countries; however it failed to gain notable attention elsewhere. A music video for the song portrayed Cher walking around Memphis dressed as Elvis Presley and singing in a bus. "One by One", co-written by Cher, was with more success. It was released as the second single in the UK and as the first single in the United States. The song peaked inside the top 10 in the UK and across Europe, as well as  charting at #52 on the US Billboard Hot 100 and #22 in Canada. Three music videos were released to promote the song worldwide, all following a story of an unhappy couple trying to get over their struggles and showing scenes of Cher singing. Two covers, Don Henley's "Not Enough Love in the World" and Frankie Valli's "The Sun Ain't Gonna Shine Anymore", were released as next singles off the album, both meeting notable chart positions in the UK and Scotland. The final single in the US was a cover of Tina Turner's  "Paradise Is Here" which was remixed and in that form reached #11 on the US Dance Club Songs chart. No music videos were released to promote the three latter singles.

Critical reception

Upon release, the album received generally favorable responses from international music critics. AllMusic's Jose F. Promis praised the album for its "torchy ballads, Western-themed epics, and R&B influences" and described it as "one of the singer's finest, as well as one of her most overlooked and underappreciated [works to date]". He also stated that the album's European mix is better. Jim Farber from Entertainment Weekly gave the album a C and while he appreciated "Walking In Memphis", stating that the song "must be heard to be believed" he wrote that the songs of the album "lack some of Cher's old camp". The Rolling Stone Album Guide rated It's a Man's World two and a half out of five stars.

Commercial performance
It's a Man's World was successful in Europe. It debuted #28 on the UK Albums Chart on the week of 12 November 1995. The album rose to its peak position of #10 during its thirteenth week on the chart following the commercial success of "One by One". The album spent a total of 22 weeks on the chart, sold over 100,000 copies in the UK and was certified gold by the British Phonographic Industry. It proved to be successful in other European countries peaking inside the top 20 in several of them and #8 in Austria. The album failed to gain notable attention elsewhere peaking #64 on the US Billboard 200 with only 9,000 copies sold in its first week  and #46 in Canada. As of 1997, the album sold 700,000 copies according to Billboard.

Track listing

Notes
  signifies a remixer
  Cher is credited as composer only in the US edition
  signifies an additional producer

Personnel 
Cher – main vocals
Anne Dudley – string arrangements

Original versions
Tracks 1, 5, 8, 9 produced by Christopher Neil
Tracks 2, 3, 6, 7, 14 produced by Stephen Lipson
Tracks 4, 10 produced by Greg Penny
Tracks 11, 12, 13 produced by Trevor Horn

American remixes
Tracks 1, 2, 4, 5 remixed by Sam Ward
Track 3 remixed by Daniel Abraham
"The Gunman" edited by the original song producer, Trevor Horn

Design
David Scheinmann – photography

Production
Craig Kostich – executive producer
Steve Fitzmaurice – mixing

Charts

Weekly charts

Year-end charts

Certifications and sales

References

External links

Cher albums
1995 albums
1996 remix albums
Warner Records albums
Warner Records remix albums
Covers albums